The 2021 CONCACAF Nations League Finals was an international football tournament held in the United States from 3 to 6 June 2021. The four national teams involved in the tournament were required to register a squad of 23 players, including three goalkeepers, by 27 May 2021, seven days prior to the opening match of the tournament. Only players in these squads were eligible to take part in the tournament. After the official announcement, changes were only allowed in case of force majeure or injury, up to 24 hours before the first match of each team.

The tournament was originally to be held in United States from 4 to 7 June 2020. On 3 April 2020, the tournament was postponed due to the COVID-19 pandemic. On 27 July 2020, CONCACAF announced that the Finals would be held in March 2021, though on 22 September 2020 CONCACAF announced that the tournament was again rescheduled until June 2021.

The age listed for each player is their age as of 3 June 2021, the first day of the tournament. The numbers of caps and goals listed for each player do not include any matches played after the start of the tournament. The club listed is the club for which the player last played a competitive match prior to the tournament. The nationality for each club reflects the national association (not the league) to which the club is affiliated. A flag is included for coaches who are of a different nationality than their own national team.

Costa Rica
Manager: Rónald González Brenes

Costa Rica's 40-man preliminary squad was announced on 9 May 2021. The final squad was announced on 25 May. After the final squad announcement, a number of changes were made:
Aarón Cruz withdrew after testing positive for COVID-19, and was replaced by Patrick Sequeira.
Kendall Waston withdrew after testing positive for COVID-19, and was replaced by Giancarlo González.
Felicio Brown withdrew as he was a close contact to the COVID-positive Kendall Waston, and was replaced by Jurguens Montenegro.
Yael López withdrew due to a muscle tear in his left hamstring, and was replaced by Barlon Sequeira. Barlon Sequeira later withdrew due to a tear in his right thigh, and was not replaced.
Rónald Matarrita withdrew injured, and was replaced by Joseph Mora.
Luis Díaz withdrew due to a right knee injury, and was replaced by Ariel Lassiter.

Honduras
Manager:  Fabián Coito

Honduras' 40-man preliminary squad was announced on 9 May 2021. The final squad was announced on 24 May. Due to injury, Maylor Núñez and Romell Quioto were replaced by Kervin Arriaga and Jorge Benguché respectively.

Mexico
Manager:  Gerardo Martino

Mexico's 40-man preliminary squad was announced on 9 May 2021. The final squad was announced on 25 May. Due to injury, Jonathan dos Santos and Érick Gutiérrez were replaced by Sebastián Córdova and Diego Lainez.

United States
Manager: Gregg Berhalter

The United States' 40-man preliminary squad was announced on 9 May 2021. The final squad was announced on 24 May.

Player representation

By age

Outfield players
Oldest:  Boniek García
Youngest:  Yunus Musah

Goalkeepers
Oldest:  Alfredo Talavera
Youngest:  David Ochoa

Captains
Oldest:  Maynor Figueroa
Youngest:  Christian Pulisic

By club

By club nationality

References

External links

Finals
June 2021 sports events in the United States
International association football competitions hosted by the United States
2021 in American soccer
Association football events postponed due to the COVID-19 pandemic
Nations League